Balikpapan is a seaport city of East Kalimantan, Indonesia.

Balikpapan may also refer to:

 Balikpapan Airport (formally Sultan Aji Muhammad Sulaiman Airport), near Balikpapan, East Kalimantan Indonesia
 Balikpapan Gulf, near Balikpapan, Indonesia
 Balikpapan Stadium (formally Batakan Stadium), football stadium in Balikpapan, Indonesia
 Battle of Balikpapan (1942), during the Japanese invasion of Borneo (Kalimantan)
 Battle of Balikpapan (1945), during the Allied invasion of Borneo (Kalimantan)
 Balikpapan-class landing craft heavy, used by the Australian Defence Force and the Papua New Guinea Defence Force
 HMAS Balikpapan (L 126), lead craft of the class, commissioned in 1971